This article lists albums and singles that were released or distributed by Star Music and its sub-labels.

Albums

1995
 Lalapit Na by Victor Neri
 Here at Last by Trina Belamide
 Rise Above Everything by Flippers
 Ligaw Tingin by Kamilyon
 ATBP. The Album by ATBP Kids
 Ang TV Na! Homecoming by various artists
 Pusong Sugatan by Taipan

1996
 Irog-Irog by Max Surban
 Jetto Aquino by Jetto Aquino
 Urge of the Human Device by Sky Church
 My First by Lindsay Custodio
 Once More (Gold Record Award) by Jamie Rivera
 Colours by Pops Fernandez
 Kindred Garden by Kindred Garden
 Ang TV Movie: The Adarna Adventure Soundtrack by various artists
 River of Penitence by Head on Collision
 Luisa by Luisa Sta. Maria
 Magbalik Ka by Belinda Cuervo
 Magic Temple (Original Motion Picture Soundtrack) by various artists

1997
 Really Wanna Tell You (Gold Record Award) by Tootsie Guevara
 James by James Coronel
 Akong Rosing-Ting by Max Surban & Yoyoy Villame
 Alay Sa'yo by Vic Joseph
 Meant To Be In Love by Geraldine Roxas
 'Di Kita Iiwan by Rocky Lazatin
 Flames: The Movie (Original Motion Picture Soundtrack) (Double Platinum Award) by various artists
 Ballroom To D' Max by Max Surban
 Indio I by Indio I
 Aimee by Aimee Evangelista
 Automatic by Glue
 Lupa't Langit by Joey Ayala
 On Higher Ground (Roselle Nava album - Double Platinum Award) by Roselle Nava
 Ako Lang by Jim Paredes
 The Jerks by The Jerks
 In Stereo by Erratics
 Carol by Carol Banawa
 Waling Waling by Earth Flight
 Walang Katapat by Hagibis
 Jigsaw by Mystery
 Christmas '97: Noel (Noisy Neighbors, Mga Piling-Piling Awiting Pamasko)

1998
 Kung Ayaw Mo, Huwag Mo! (Original Soundtrack) by various artists
 Richard Marten by Richard Marten
 Inter Galactic Party  by Immaculate Dirt
 Mabuhay Ka, Pilipino! Awit Para Sa Sentenaryo 1998 by various artists
 New Horizons by Lindsay Custodio
 Dennis Arriola by Dennis Arriola
 Nagbibinata (Original Motion Picture Soundtrack) by various artists
 Labs Kita...Okey Ka Lang? (Original Motion Picture Soundtrack) (Double Platinum Award) by various artists
 Starstruck: Star's Greatest Hits by various artists
 Intimate Mood by Jeffrey Hidalgo
 Sulyap by Noah Sindac
 Sa Araw ng Pasko (the Star Records all-star Christmas album - Platinum Record Award) by various artists
 Heart and Soul (Platinum Record) by Jeremiah
 Puso ng Pasko (Original Soundtrack) by various artists
 Mga Awiting Pamasko Medley

1999
 Jolina (7× Platinum Award) by Jolina Magdangal
 Mula sa Puso ni Esperanza by various artists
 Kaba (Platinum Record Award) by Tootsie Guevara
 GIMIK: The Reunion (Original Motion Picture Soundtrack) (Gold Record Award) by various artists
 Nagmamahal Pa Rin Sa 'Yo (Gold Record Award) by Pops Fernandez
 Ang Harana by Max Surban
 Feels So Right (Gold Record Award) by Jamie Rivera
 Simply Roselle (Roselle Nava album - Gold Record Award) by Roselle Nava
 Keep on Dancing: The Album by various artists
 Hey Babe! (Original Motion Picture Soundtrack) (Gold Record Award) by various artists
 Oo Na Mahal na Kung Mahal Kita by Frasco
 Pasko na Sab by Sakdap
 Ara Mina (Gold Record Award) by Ara Mina
 Starstruck, Vol. 2: Star's Greatest Hits by various artists
 Session Road by sessiOnroad
 Di Ba't Pasko'y Pag-Ibig? by various artists
 Songs Inspired by Esperanza: The Movie by various artists

2000
 On Memory Lane (6× Platinum Award) by Jolina Magdangal
 Pakita Mo by Randy Santiago
 Nikki Valdez by Nikki Valdez
 JCS (John, Carlo and Stefaro) by JCS
 Shaina by Shaina Magdayao
 Groove-a-Pella by III of a Kind
 Unaware, Unwarned by Sky Church
 Anak Official Soundtrack by various artists
 Komedya Karambola by Max Surban
 Jeremiah by Jeremiah
 Can This Be Love by Jeffrey Hidalgo
 CAROL Repackaged (Platinum Record) by Carol Banawa
 Love is Right by Janet Basco
 Jimmy Bondoc by Jimmy Bondoc
 Teenhearts by Teenhearts
 Ibigay Mo Na by Jessa Zaragoza
 Sa Puso Ko by Tootsie Guevara
 One Day Heartache by Gilbert Golez
 Tin Arnaldo by Tin Arnaldo
 Mari by Marri Nallos
 Starstruck, Vol. 3: Star's Greatest Hits by various artists
 World Youth Day...Emmanuel by Various Artists
 Tanging Yaman: Inspirational Album by Various Artists

2001
 Heal Our Land by Jamie Rivera
 Heavenly Ara Mina by Ara Mina
 Kailan Mo Ako Mamahalin by Rocky Lazatin
 Red Alert by Jolina Magdangal
 Kundiman by various artists
 Respect by Dessa
 Genuflect by Formula
 Seasons by Jamie Rivera
 Star OPM Power Hits by various artists

2002
 All About Love (Roselle Nava album - Platinum Record) by Roselle Nava
 Best Of STAR OPM Revival Hits Volume 2 by various artists
 Freshmen by Freshmen
 Jolina Sings the Masters by Jolina Magdangal
 Himig Handog Love Songs by various artists

2003
 Follow Your Heart by Carol Banawa
 Only Selfless Love by Jamie Rivera
 Star OPM Duets by various artists
 The Brightest Stars Of Christmas by various artists
 The Power of Four by various artists

2004
 A Better Me by Divo Bayer
 Ang Tanging Ina Nyo by Ai-Ai delas Alas
 Ako Si by Gloc-9
 Ang Tunay na Idol by April Boy Regino
Come In Out of the Rain by Sheryn Regis
 Purpose Driven Life by Jamie Rivera
 Reel Love by Erik Santos and Sheryn Regis
 Star OPM Power Hits Vol. 3 by various artists
 This Is the Moment by Erik Santos

2005
 Graduation Day by Blue Ketchup
 Loving You Now by Erik Santos
 Pinoy Champs by various artists
 Pure Heart by Gary Valenciano
 Soulful by Ella May Saison
 Top Male OPM Hits by various artists
 What I Do Best by Sheryn Regis

2006
 Sam Milby by Sam Milby 
 Star OPM Power Hits Vol. 4 by various artists
 The Modern Jukebox Collection by Sheryn Regis

2007
 A Little Too Perfect by Sam Milby 
 All I Want This Christmas by Erik Santos
 Chad Peralta by Chad Peralta
 Judy Ann Santos-Musika Ng Buhay Ko by various artists
 Para Lang Sa'Yo by Aiza Seguerra
 Sana Maulit Muli (Official Soundtrack) by various artists

2008
 A Gary Valenciano All-Star Tribute Collection by various artists
 Charice by Charice
 Charlie Green by Charlie Green
 Maging Sino Ka Man: Ang Pagbabalik: Original Teleserye Soundtrack by various artists
 Musika At Pelikula – A Star Cinema Classic Collection by various artists
 Open Arms by Aiza Seguerra
 Paano Na Kaya by Bugoy Drilon
 PDA Season 2 Scholars Sing Cayabyab by Pinoy Dream Academy (season 2) scholars
 Silver Lining by Acel Van Ommen
 The Real Me by Bea Alonzo
 Your Love: Limited Platinum Edition Repackaged by Erik Santos

2009
 Aiza Seguerra Live by Aiza Seguerra
 My Inspiration by Charice
 Journey To The Heart by Fatima Soriano

2010
 3 A.M. by 3 A.M.
 Bugoy Drilon by Bugoy Drilon
 I Star 15 Anniversary Collection: The Best Of Dance Novelty Songs by various artists
 My Music My Life Carol Banawa by Carol Banawa
 Ngayong Pasko Magniningning Ang Pilipino by various artists

2011
 Angeline Quinto by Angeline Quinto
 Angeline Quinto: Patuloy Ang Pangarap by Angeline Quinto
 Bida Best Hits Da Best by various artists
 Da Best Ang Pasko Ng Pilipino by various artists
 I LOVE YOU by various artists
 Nang Dahil sa Pag-ibig by Bugoy Drilon
 Songs From The Vault by Aiza Seguerra
 We Are Whatever by Bret Jackson and James Reid
 With Love by Gary Valenciano
 Visions by Fatima Soriano

2012
 A Beautiful Affair Official Soundtrack by various artists
 Dahil Sa Pag-Ibig Official Soundtrack by various artists
 Daniel Padilla by Daniel Padilla
 Fall In Love Again by Angeline Quinto
 Hanggang Ngayon by Bryan Termulo
 OPM Number 1s: Volume 3 by various artists
 Love Songs From Princess And I Teleserye by various artists

2013
 Apoy Sa Dagat Official Soundtrack by various artists
 Chapter – 10 by Charice
 DJP by Daniel Padilla
 Enrique Gil: King of the Gil by Enrique Gil
 Himig Handog P-Pop Love Songs by various artists
 Higher Love by Angeline Quinto
 Kahit Konting Pagtingin Official Soundtrack by various artists
 Muling Buksan Ang Puso: The Official Soundtrack by various artists
 The Erik Santos Collection by Erik Santos

2014
 Got to Believe: The Official Soundtrack by various artists
 Star Cinema 20th Commemorative Album by various artists
 Renzo Vergara by Renzo Vergara
 Dyesebel: The Official Soundtrack by various artists
 Ikaw Lamang: The Official Soundtrack by various artists
 Celestine by Toni Gonzaga
 Himig Handog P-Pop Love Songs 2014 by various artists
 Kathryn by Kathryn Bernardo

2015
 I Feel Good by Daniel Padilla
 Back to Love by Jolina Magdangal
 Morissette by Morissette

2016
 DJ Greatest Hits by Daniel Padilla
 FPJ's Ang Probinsyano: The Official Soundtrack by various artists

2018
 Malaya by Moira Dela Torre

2019
 Feels Trip by Agsunta
 Ang Soundtrack Ng Bahay Mo by various artists

2020
 Patawad by Moira Dela Torre

2021
 Connected Na Tayo (Ang Soundtrack Ng Bahay Mo Vol. 2) by various artists
 Unloving U (Official Soundtrack) by various artists
 Marry Me, Marry You (Official Soundtrack) by various artists
 New Views by Kyle Echarri
 Click, Like, Share (Original Soundtrack) by various artists
 Piece of the Puzzle by Trisha Denise
 My Sunset Girl (Original Soundtrack) by Anji Salvacion and KD Estrada
 K1N5E by Six Part Invention
 The Light by BGYO
 Born to Win by BINI
 Saying Goodbye (Official Soundtrack) by SAB and Angela Ken
 Love is Color Blind (Official Soundtrack) by Belle Mariano and SAB

2022
 maybe forever by Jeremy G
 Zephanie by Zephanie
 Gigi De Lana by Gigi De Lana
 Bola Bola (Original Soundtrack) by BGYO, KD Estrada, and Akira Morishita
 How To Move On in 30 Days (Original Soundtrack) by Jeremy G and Angela Ken
 Kasingkasing Dalampasigan by Anji Salvacion
 Run To Me (Official Soundtrack) by Alexa Ilacad and KD Estrada
 Love In 40 Days (Official Soundtrack) by various artists
 WTF I actually wrote these songs by Janine Berdin
 Lyric and Beat, Vol. 1 (Official Soundtrack) by various artists
 Be Us by BGYO

Extended Plays

2021
 Born to Win - EP by BINI

Singles

2013
 Mula sa Puso by the ABS-CBN Philharmonic Orchestra

2014
 Bakit Pa Ba by Gab Maturan
 Di Mapaliwanag by Morissette

2016
 Something I Need by Morissette and Piolo Pascual
 Baby I Love Your Way by Morissette and Harana

2018
 Panaginip by Morissette

2019
 Bagong Umaga by Agsunta
 Papara by Morissette
 Miss Kita Kung Christmas by Morissette and ST. WOLF
 Diyan Ba Sa Langit by Morissette, Jason Dy, and KIKX

2020
 Kapamilya Forever by Angelo Anilao
 Pag-Ibig Ang Hihilom Sa Daigdig by Raizo Chabeldin and Biv De Vera
 Bawal Lumabas (The Classroom Song) by Kim Chiu
 Akin Ka Na Lang (Latin Version) by Morissette
 Ang Sa Iyo Ay Akin (From "Ang Sa Iyo Ay Akin") by Aegis
 Yakapin Ang Pasko by Bernadette Sembrano
 Ikaw ang Liwanag at Ligaya by various artists
 Da Coconut Nut by BINI

2021
 Bagong Umaga by KZ Tandingan
 Huwag Kang Mangamba by Angeline Quinto
 The Light by BGYO
 Pwede Na Ba by KVN
 He's Into Her by BGYO
 The Baddest by BGYO
 Yakap by Bernadette Sembrano
 Kimmi by Kim Chiu and DJ M.O.D.
 Feel Good Pilipinas by KZ Tandingan and BGYO
 Feel Good Pilipinas (Extended Remix) by KZ Tandingan and BGYO
 Runnin' by BGYO and Keiko Necesario
 While We Are Young by BGYO
 Kulay (Miss Universe Philippines 2021) by BGYO
 Born to Win by BINI
 Kapit Lang by BINI
 Pinoy Tayo by Rico Blanco
 Sikat Ang Pinoy by Agsunta and Kritiko
 Kabataang Pinoy by Nameless Kids
 Nasa'yo Ako by Gigi De Lana
 Sakalam by Gigi De Lana and the GigiVibes Band
 Andito Tayo Para Sa Isa't Isa by various artists
 Shine (25th Anniversary Version) by Morissette

2022
 It's Okay Not To Be Okay by Angela Ken
 Gusto Ko Nang Bumitaw (From "The Broken Marriage Vow") by Morissette
 Misteryo by KD Estrada and Alexa Ilacad
 When I See You Again by KD Estrada and Alexa Ilacad
 Kabataang Pinoy by BINI and SB19
 Dalampasigan by Anji Salvacion
 Up! by BINI and BGYO
 Best Time by BGYO
 Life's A Beach - From "Beach Bros" by Jeremy G and Nameless Kids
 Huwag Mo Kong Iwan by Ogie Alcasid
 Para Sa'yo by Shanaia Gomez
 Kundi Ikaw by Seth Fedelin
 Tumitigil Ang Mundo by BGYO
 Patuloy Lang Ang Lipad (Theme of "Darna") by BGYO
 Magnet by BGYO

References

Record label discographies
 Discography